Felipe Augusto de Abreu, known as Felipe Augusto or Felipe Abreu (born 31 August 1993) is a Brazilian football player.

Club career
He made his professional debut in the Segunda Liga for Vizela on 6 August 2016 in a game against Académico de Viseu.

References

External links

1993 births
Footballers from Rio de Janeiro (city)
Brazilian footballers
Living people
Brazilian expatriate footballers
Expatriate footballers in Portugal
G.D. Tourizense players
F.C. Vizela players
C.D. Trofense players
Varzim S.C. players
Liga Portugal 2 players
Association football forwards